Wilbourns is an unincorporated community in the Oak Hill Township, Granville County, North Carolina, United States. It is also home to the Marcus Royster Plantation which was listed on the National Register of Historic Places in 1988.

External links
 GNIS Wilbourns

References 

Unincorporated communities in North Carolina
Populated places in Granville County, North Carolina
Granville